Usu as the official romanized name and transliterated from Mongolian, also known as Wusu, is a county-level city with more than 100,000 residents in Xinjiang, China. It is a part of Tacheng Prefecture of Ili Kazakh Autonomous Prefecture. Oil production is a major part of the economy while the county is an oasis in the Dzungarian Basin. Wusu lies between the major cities of Bole and Shihezi in Northern Xinjiang and west of Ürümqi and Kuitun, south of Karamay.

Transport
Wusu is served by China National Highway 312, the Northern Xinjiang and the Second Ürümqi-Jinghe Railways.

Administrative divisions 
Subdistrict (街道)
Xinshiqu Subdistrict (新市区街道, يېڭىشەھەر كوچا باشقارمىسى),  Nanyuan Subdistrict (南苑街道, جەنۇبى باغچا كوچا باشقارمىسى), Xichengqu Subdistrict (西城区街道, غەربىي شەھەر كوچا باشقارمىسى), Hongqiao Subdistrict (虹桥街道, قىزىل كۆۋرۈك كوچا باشقارمىسى), Kuihe Subdistrict (奎河街道, كۈيتۇن دەرياسى كوچا باشقارمىسى)
Town (镇)
Baiyanggou (白杨沟镇, بەيياڭگۇ بازىرى), Hatubuhu (哈图布呼镇, خاتۇبۇخ بازىرى), Huanggong (皇宫镇), Chepaizi (车排子镇, چېپەيزە), Ganhezi (甘河子镇, گەنخوزا), Baiquan (Baychuan) (百泉镇, بەيچۇەن),  Sikeshu (Chigshor) (四棵树镇, چىگشور),  Guertu (Gürt) (古尔图镇, گۈرت),  Xihu (西湖镇), Xidagou (Shidagu, شىخۇ) (西大沟镇, شىداگۇ)
Townships 乡 	
Bashisihu Township (八十四户乡, باشىسىخۇ يېزىسى), Jiahezi Township (夹河子乡, جياخېزى), Jiujianlou Township (九间楼乡, جۇجەنلۇ), Shiqiao Township (石桥乡, شىچياۋ),  Toutai Township (头台乡, توتەي)
Ethnic townships (民族乡)
Jirgilti Golin Mongol Township (吉尔格勒特郭愣蒙古族乡, چىرگىلتى گولىن موڭغۇل يېزىسى), Tablihat Mongol Township (塔布勒合特蒙古族乡. تابىلخات موڭغۇل يېزىسى)
Others
Ganjia Lake Ranch (甘家湖牧场), Bayingou Ranch (巴音沟牧场), Saileketi Ranch (赛力克提牧场), Wusu Prison (乌苏监狱, شىخۇ تۈرمىسى), Ganjia Lake Forest Area 甘家湖林场, 兵团123团 (123-تۇەن مەيدانى), 兵团124团 (124-تۇەن مەيدانى), 兵团125团 (125-تۇەن مەيدانى), 兵团126团 (126-تۇەن مەيدانى), 兵团127团 (127-تۇەن مەيدانى), 兵团128团 (128-تۇەن مەيدانى), 兵团130团 (130-تۇەن مەيدانى)

Climate

References

County-level divisions of Xinjiang
Populated places in Xinjiang
Oases of China
Tacheng Prefecture